A.S.D. Pro Recco (Official name: Associazione Sportiva Dilettantistica Pro Recco) is an Italian water polo club from Recco, in Liguria. It currently plays in Serie A1. 

Pro Recco is the most successful club in men's water polo. In men's domestic water polo, the club has won a record 51 trophies: a record 34 Serie A1 titles, a record 17 Coppa Italia. In men's LEN European competitions, Pro Recco have won a record 18 trophies: a record 10 LEN Champions League titles, a record 8 LEN Super Cups. The club has also won 1 Adriatic League title.

In women's water polo, the women's team won 1 women's Serie A1 titles, 1 LEN Euro League Women title, 1 Women's LEN Super Cup, making Pro Recco the first sports club in history to have been crowned European Champions with both its men's and women's teams.

History
Pro Recco was founded in 1913 as Rari Nantes Enotria. It has played in the A1 league, the Italian top division, since 1935.

The club is owned by Genovese businessman Gabriele Volpi, who also owns football club Spezia, competing in Serie A, the first tier of Italian football leagues.

It has won a total of 34 national titles, the first in 1959 and the latest in 2022; and the Coppa Italia in 1974, 2006, 2007, 2008, 2009, 2010, 2011, 2013, 2014, 2015, 2016, 2017, 2018, 2019, 2021, 2022 and 2023. They have won the LEN Champions League in 1964, 1983, 2003, 2007, 2008, 2010, 2012, 2015, 2021 and 2022; the LEN Super Cup in 2004, 2007, 2008, 2010, 2012, 2015, 2021 and 2022.

Pro Recco has had a women's team since the 2011–12 season.

Honours

Domestic competitions
  Italian League
 Champions (34): 1959, 1960, 1961, 1962, 1964, 1965, 1966, 1967, 1968, 1969, 1970, 1971, 1972, 1974, 1978, 1982, 1983, 1984, 2002, 2006, 2007, 2008, 2009, 2010, 2011, 2012, 2013, 2014, 2015, 2016, 2017, 2018, 2019, 2022
  Coppa Italia
 Winners (17): 1974, 2006, 2007, 2008, 2009, 2010, 2011, 2013, 2014, 2015, 2016, 2017, 2018, 2019, 2021, 2022, 2023

European competitions

LEN competitions
 LEN Champions League (Champions Cup)
Winners (10): 1965, 1984, 2003, 2007, 2008, 2010, 2012, 2015, 2021, 2022

 LEN Super Cup
Winners (8):  2003, 2007, 2008, 2010, 2012, 2015, 2021, 2022

Other competitions
 Adriatic League
Winners (1):  2012

Current team

First team

Head coach:  Sandro Sukno

Players:

  Matteo Aicardi
  Marco Del Lungo (GK)
  Francesco Di Fulvio
  Matteo Iocchi Gratta
  Luka Lončar
  Gonzalo Echenique
  Pietro Figlioli
  Ben Hallock
  Aleksandar Ivović (C)
  Aaron Younger
  Gergő Zalánki
  Tommaso Negri (GK)
  Nicholas Presciutti
  Alessandro Velotto
  Andrea Fondelli

Famous players

Italian players

  Simona Abbate
  Marco Del Lungo
  Matteo Aicardi
  Alberto Angelini
  Fabio Bencivenga
  Daniele Bettini
  Roberta Bianconi
   Michaël Bodegas
  Gonzalo Echenique
  Maurizio Felugo
   Pietro Figlioli
   Deni Fiorentini
   Goran Fiorentini
  Federico Lapenna
  Stefano Luongo
  Alessandro Calcaterra
  Alessandro Caliogna
  Luigi Castagnola
  Aleksandra Cotti
  Marco D'Altrui
  Arnaldo Deserti
  Luigi Di Costanzo
  Francesco Di Fulvio
  Francesco Ferrari
  Massimiliano Ferretti
  Niccolò Figari
  Andrea Fondelli
  Teresa Frassinetti
  Alberto Ghibellini
  Massimo Giacoppo
  Elena Gigli
  Alex Giorgetti
  Niccolò Gitto
  Luca Giustolisi
  Luca Gualco
  Giancarlo Guerrini
  Franco Lavoratori
  Gianni Lonzi
  Daniele Magalotti
  Mario Majoni
  Andrea Mangiante
  Federico Mistrangelo
  Tommaso Negri
  Paolo Oliva
  Giacomo Pastorino
  Paolo Petronelli
  Eraldo Pizzo
   Danijel Premuš
  Christian Presciutti
  Nicholas Presciutti
  Elisa Queirolo
  Paolo Ragosa
  Giulia Rambaldi
   Olexandr Sadovyy
  Roldano Simeoni
  Leonardo Sottani
  Stefano Tempesti
  Alessandro Velotto
    Goran Volarević
  Christopher Washburn

Foreign players

  Joe Kayes
  Aaron Younger
   Felipe Perrone
  Marko Bijač
  Luka Lončar
  Damir Burić
  Andro Bušlje
  Nikša Dobud
  Maro Joković
  Tomislav Paškvalin
  Sandro Sukno
  Guillermo Molina
  Jesús Rollán
  Giorgi Mshvenieradze
  Revaz Chomakhidze
  Tibor Benedek
  György Horkai
  Gergő Zalánki
  Tamás Kásás
  Norbert Madaras
  Tamás Märcz
  István Szívós
  Márton Szívós
  Aleksandar Ivović
  Mlađan Janović
  Predrag Jokić
  Mirko Vičević
  Boris Zloković
  Dušan Damjanović
  Filip Filipović
  Danilo Ikodinović
  Dušan Mandić
  Slobodan Nikić
  Duško Pijetlović
  Andrija Prlainović
  Nikola Rađen
  Dejan Savić
  Vanja Udovičić
  Vladimir Vujasinović
  Ben Hallock

Famous coaches
 Ratko Rudić
 Giuseppe Porzio
 Igor Milanović

References

External links
  

LEN Euroleague clubs
Water polo clubs in Liguria
Water polo clubs in Italy
Sport in Liguria